Claisebrook is an area in the Central Business District of Perth, Western Australia, and may refer to:
Claisebrook railway station
Claisebrook railway depot 
Claise Brook, a watercourse which discharges into the Swan River at Claisebrook Cove